Nanzhou railway station is a railway station located in Nanzhou Township, Pingtung County, Taiwan. It is located on the Pingtung line and is operated by Taiwan Railways.

References

1923 establishments in Taiwan
Railway stations opened in 1923
Railway stations in Pingtung County
Railway stations served by Taiwan Railways Administration